The 1999 Family Circle Cup singles was the singles event of the twenty-seventh edition of the tennis tournament played at Hilton Head, United States. It is the third WTA Tier I tournament of the year, and part of the US Spring tennis season. Amanda Coetzer was the defending champion but lost in the third round to Henrieta Nagyová.

Martina Hingis won in the final 6–4, 6–3 against Anna Kournikova.

Seeds
The top eight seeds received a bye to the second round.

Draw

Finals

Top half

Section 1

Section 2

Bottom half

Section 3

Section 4

Qualifying

Seeds

Qualifiers

Lucky loser
  Larisa Neiland

Qualifying draw

First qualifier

Second qualifier

Third qualifier

Fourth qualifier

Fifth qualifier

Sixth qualifier

Seventh qualifier

Eighth qualifier

External links
 1999 Family Circle Cup draw

Family Circle Cup
Charleston Open